The 1992 New York Giants season was the franchise's 68th season in the National Football League. The Giants finished in fourth place in the National Football Conference East Division with a 6–10 record. Head coach Ray Handley was fired after this season, when the Giants finished 1–6 after starting the season 5–4.

Injuries marred the Giants' season, especially at quarterback. Phil Simms, once again the team's starting quarterback, suffered a season-ending elbow injury in Week 4. With Simms out the team once again turned to Jeff Hostetler, the Giants' original 1991 starter and winner of Super Bowl XXV, to take his place. Hostetler, who had his own troubles with injuries including a broken back that ended his 1991 season, soon found himself out of the lineup after suffering a concussion in Week 12. The Giants were then forced to turn to a pair of rookies, Kent Graham and Dave Brown, but Graham suffered from elbow and shoulder problems, and Brown suffered a broken right thumb. Hostetler returned for the final two games of the season, a win over the Kansas City Chiefs and a loss to the Philadelphia Eagles.

Perhaps the most catastrophic injury was the torn Achilles' tendon suffered by future Hall of Fame linebacker Lawrence Taylor in Week 10, as the Giants only won once more after the injury. It was the second consecutive year that an injury to Taylor ended his season prematurely (a sprained knee in Week 13 of the 1991 season forced Taylor to miss the final game of the regular season and a previous game against the Cincinnati Bengals).

Offseason

NFL Draft

Roster

Regular season

Schedule

Standings

See also
List of New York Giants seasons

References

New York Giants seasons
New York Giants
New York Giants season
20th century in East Rutherford, New Jersey
Meadowlands Sports Complex